The minister of state for veterans' affairs is a ministerial position in the Cabinet Office in the British government, currently held by Johnny Mercer who took the office on 25 October 2022. Earlier, it was jointly with the Ministry of Defence. The officeholder has attended cabinet since 7 July 2022.

History 
It was formerly known as Parliamentary Under-Secretary of State for Defence from 1989 to 2005 and as Parliamentary Under-Secretary of State for Defence Veterans, Reserves and Personnel under Tobias Ellwood. Johnny Mercer was appointed minister in July 2019 to the new government by incoming Prime Minister Boris Johnson. On 20 April 2021, Mercer was "sacked by text" after offering to resign at the end of Wednesday 21 April, but refusing to go earlier. In a tweet, Mercer said he was "relieved of [his] responsibilities in Government" because of his disagreements with the scope of the proposed Overseas Operations Bill. This new government law is designed to protect veterans from unfounded prosecutions. However, Mercer said it was a "red line" for him that British soldiers who served in Northern Ireland are excluded.

Responsibilities 
The minister has the following ministerial responsibilities:

civilian and service personnel policy
armed forces pay, pensions and compensation
Armed Forces Covenant
welfare and service families
community engagement
equality, diversity and inclusion
veterans (including resettlement, transition, defence charities and Ministerial Covenant and Veterans Board, and Office of Veteran Affairs)
legacy issues and non-operational public inquiries and inquests
mental health
Defence Medical Services
the people programme (Flexible Engagement Strategy, Future Accommodation Model and Enterprise Approach)
estates service family accommodation policy and engagement with welfare

List of ministers

References